The 1937–38 Yorkshire Cup was the thirtieth occasion on which the  Yorkshire Cup competition had been held.

The  Yorkshire Cup competition was a knock-out competition between (mainly professional) rugby league clubs from  the  county of Yorkshire. The actual area was at times increased to encompass other teams from  outside the  county such Mansfield, Coventry, this season's appearance of  Newcastle, and even last year's appearance of London (in the form of Acton & Willesden. The competition always took place early in the season, in the Autumn, with the final taking place in (or just before) December (The only exception to this was when disruption of the fixture list was caused during, and immediately after, the two World Wars)

Leeds won the trophy by beating Huddersfield by the score of 14-8

The match was played at Belle Vue, in the City of Wakefield, now in West Yorkshire. The attendance was 22,000 and receipts were £1,508

This was Leeds' last of their six victories in a period of ten years, during which time they won every Yorkshire Cup final in which they appeared.

Background 

This season there were no junior/amateur clubs taking part, no new entrants and no "leavers" and so the total of entries remained the  same at sixteen.

This in turn resulted in no in the first round.

Competition and results

Round 1 
Involved  8 matches (with no byes) and 16 clubs

Round 1 - replays  
Involved  1 match and 2 clubs

Round 2 – quarterfinals 
Involved 4 matches and 8 clubs

Round 3 – semifinals  
Involved 2 matches and 4 clubs

Final

Teams and scorers 

Scoring - Try = three (3) points - Goal = two (2) points - Drop goal = two (2) points

The road to success

Notes and comments 
1 * This was Newcastle,s second (and last) season in the league. According to "the Grounds of Rugby League" Newcastle RLFC moved for 1937/38 to the new White City Stadium in Gateshead.from the previous season's venue of Brough Park.

2 * Belle Vue is the home ground of Wakefield Trinity with a capacity of approximately 12,500. The record attendance was 37,906 on the 21 March 1936 in the Challenge Cup semi-final between Leeds and Huddersfield

See also 
1937–38 Northern Rugby Football League season
Rugby league county cups

References

External links
Saints Heritage Society
1896–97 Northern Rugby Football Union season at wigan.rlfans.com
Hull&Proud Fixtures & Results 1896/1897
Widnes Vikings - One team, one passion Season In Review - 1896-97
The Northern Union at warringtonwolves.org

1937 in English rugby league
RFL Yorkshire Cup